Alderson station is an Amtrak station in Alderson, West Virginia, served by the Cardinal.  It is located at 1 C&O Plaza, and functions as a request stop. The station is a contributing property within the Alderson Historic District, which has been listed on the National Register of Historic Places since November 12, 1993.

The wood frame depot, originally built by the Chesapeake and Ohio Railway (C&O) in 1896, is typical of a standard station built on the C&O system between 1890 and 1914. It features board and batten walls, decorative brackets, fancy stick work on the gable ends and deep eaves. The railroad enlarged the structure in 1924.

Amtrak began serving the community on April 29, 1979. Between December 4, 2001, and the second half of 2004, service to the station was suspended, partially due to painting that changed the station from white to orange. It was Amtrak's third least-busy station for fiscal year
2014.

References

External links

Alderson Amtrak Station (USA Rail Guide -- Train Web)
Photo of white station at Amtrak Photo Archive

Amtrak stations in West Virginia
Buildings and structures in Monroe County, West Virginia
Railway stations in West Virginia
Stations along Chesapeake and Ohio Railway lines
Transportation in Monroe County, West Virginia
Railway stations in the United States opened in 1896